The Wright House is a historic house located at 415 Fletcher St. in Thomasville, Georgia.

Description and history 
It is a one-story hipped roof cottage that was built in 1854. Elements of its Greek Revival style include its front doorway with sidelights and transom, and the symmetry of its front facade. It has a front entry porch with six square-panelled columns, with the panels carved decoratively. Additions have been made to the rear but these do not detract from the historic front facade.

It was listed in the National Register of Historic Places on August 12, 1970.  It is also included in the Fletcherville Historic District.

References

External links
 

Houses on the National Register of Historic Places in Georgia (U.S. state)
Houses in Thomas County, Georgia
Greek Revival houses in Georgia (U.S. state)
Houses completed in 1854
National Register of Historic Places in Thomas County, Georgia
Individually listed contributing properties to historic districts on the National Register in Georgia (U.S. state)